Gustav Kastner-Kirdorf (born February 2, 1881 in Trumpfsee-Warnitz; died May 4, 1945 in Berchtesgaden) was a German aviator who served in the Luftwaffe during the first and second World Wars.

Early years

In 1899, he became a member of the Burschenschaft Hevellia Berlin. Kirdorf occurred on February 5, 1904, as Fahnenjunker in the Infantry Regiment Lutzow Nr. 25. There he was first a company officer, later an adjutant of the first battalion and last regimental adjutant until March 21, 1914. Then he was from March 22, to August 3, 1914, company officer in the infantry regiment Graf Barfuß No. 17. Here he made in July 1914 a pilot training.

World War I 

With the outbreak of First World War Kirdford acted from August 4 to September 10, 1914 as General Staff Officer and leader of the flyer Detachment Deputy of the XIV Corps (German Empire). He acted on several positions and was not wounded. From January 1919 to June 1919 he was commander of the Neuruppin airport. He left the army on June 8, 1919.

Reichswehr
On August 1, 1927, Kirdorf was employed by the Reichswehr as a civilian employee and graduated in that capacity until the end of September 1930 a secret aviator training in the Soviet Union. After returning to Germany, he became the head of the advertising department of the German Air Sports Association. He held this function from October 1, 1930, until the end of March 1934.

Luftwaffe 
From April 1, 1934, to the end of June 1938 Kirdorf became head of the flight readiness of the Ministry of Aviation (Nazi Germany). After some other positions he became on February 1, 1939, head of the staff-office of the Luftwaffe. In April 1943 he received another position.

Death
On May 4, 1945, Kastner-Kirdorf committed suicide by shooting himself in the head. In his book, Beyond Band of Brothers: The War Memoirs of Major Dick Winters, Richard Winters recounts finding Kastner-Kirdorf's body in Goering's private compound at Berchtesgaden.

Promotions
 February 19, 1904, Fahnenjunker - Gefreiter
 May 30, 1904, Fahnenjunker - Unteroffizier
 September 15, 1904, Fähnrich
 November 15, 1904, Lieutenant
 November 19, 1911, Lieutenant
 November 28, 1914, Captain
 October 20, 1919, as a character Major
 April 1, 1934, Lieutenant Colonel
 October 1, 1935, Colonel
 June 1, 1938, Major general
 January 1, 1940, Lieutenant General
 July 1, 1941, General der Flieger

References

Further reading 
 Bradley, Dermot (Hrsg.), Karl Friedrich Hildebrand: Die Generale der deutschen Luftwaffe 1935–1945. Die militärischen Werdegänge der Generale, sowie der Ärzte, Veterinäre, Intendanten, Richter und Ministerialbeamten im Generalsrang. Band 2: Habermehl–Nuber. Biblio Verlag, Osnabrück 1991, p. 153–154.
 Dvorak, Helge: Biographisches Lexikon der Deutschen Burschenschaft. Band I: Politiker, Teilband 7: Supplement A–K, Winter, Heidelberg 2013, . p. 527–528.

Luftstreitkräfte personnel
Generals of Aviators
Recipients of the Iron Cross (1914), 1st class
1881 births
1945 deaths
German military personnel who committed suicide
Suicides by firearm in Austria
1945 suicides
Luftwaffe personnel of World War II
Luftwaffe World War II generals
Lieutenant generals of the Luftwaffe
Military personnel from Brandenburg